"Whoknows" is the second and last single from Musiq Soulchild's third album, Soulstar. It was released as an airplay-only single in January, 2004. Former En Vogue singer Dawn Robinson is credited with contributing background vocals.

It debuted on the Billboard Hot R&B/Hip-Hop Songs chart on January 31, 2004, spent 24 weeks on the chart (its last being July 10, 2004) and peaked at No. 23.

"Whoknows" entered the Billboard Hot 100 on April 24, 2004, spending 13 weeks there, peaking at No. 65 and falling off on July 10, 2004.

References

Musiq Soulchild songs
2004 singles
2003 songs
Songs written by Musiq Soulchild
Songs written by Ivan Barias
Songs written by Carvin Haggins
Songs written by Frank Romano